In mathematics, particularly numerical analysis, the Bramble–Hilbert lemma, named after James H. Bramble and Stephen Hilbert, bounds the error of an approximation of a function  by a polynomial of order at most  in terms of derivatives of  of order .

Additional assumptions on the domain are needed for the Bramble–Hilbert lemma to hold. Essentially, the boundary of the domain must be "reasonable". For example, domains that have a spike or a slit with zero angle at the tip are excluded. Lipschitz domains are reasonable enough, which includes convex domains and domains with continuously differentiable boundary. 

This is an essential step in error estimates for the finite element method. The Bramble–Hilbert lemma is applied there on the domain consisting of one element (or, in some superconvergence results, a small number of elements).

The one-dimensional case

Before stating the lemma in full generality, it is useful to look at some simple special cases. In one dimension and for a function  that has  derivatives on interval , the lemma reduces to

where  is the space of all polynomials of degree at most  and  indicates
the th derivative of a function .

Statement of the lemma

The Sobolev seminorm on  consists of the  norms of the highest order derivatives,

and

The original result

The statement of the lemma here is a simple rewriting of the right-hand inequality stated in Theorem 1 in. The  norm is not the usual one but the terms are scaled with  so that the right-hand inequality in the equivalence of the seminorms comes out exactly as in the statement here.

In the original result, the choice of the polynomial is not specified, and the value of constant and its dependence on the domain  cannot be determined from the proof.

A constructive form

Suppose that  is the supremum of the diameters of such balls.

Then the lemma holds with the constant , that is, the constant depends on the domain  only through its chunkiness  and the dimension of the space .

where

Such function  always exists.

For more details and a tutorial treatment, see the monograph by Brenner and Scott. The result can be extended to the case when the domain  is the union of a finite number of star-shaped domains, which is slightly more general than the strong cone property, and other polynomial spaces than the space of all polynomials up to a given degree.

Bound on linear functionals

This result follows immediately from the above lemma, and it is also called sometimes the Bramble–Hilbert lemma, for example by Ciarlet. It is essentially Theorem 2 from.

Suppose that  for all . Then there exists a constant  such that

References

External links
 
 https://arxiv.org/abs/0710.5148 – Jan Mandel: The Bramble–Hilbert Lemma

Lemmas in analysis
Approximation theory
Finite element method